Snuggle is a brand of fabric softener sold by Henkel North American Consumer Goods in the United States and Canada. The brand was introduced  in 1983 by Unilever. The product is available in sheets or liquid (in concentrate and ready-to-use forms).

In September 2008, Vestar Capital Partners acquired the North American (United States, Canada, and Puerto Rico) laundry business of Unilever, which included the Snuggle, Wisk, All, Surf, and Sunlight brands. The former Unilever businesses were combined with Huish Detergents, Inc. to form the Sun Products Corporation.

On June 24, 2016, Henkel Consumer Goods Inc., a subsidiary of Henkel AG & Co. KGaA  signed a definitive agreement to acquire the Sun Products Corporation. The transaction was valued at $3.5 billion.

Mascot 
The brand was launched in 1983. The Snuggle Bear is a teddy bear that  was introduced in 1986 and has been the mascot for the Snuggle line of fabric softener since then. The puppet was created by Kermit Love.  The voice was originally provided by Corinne Orr. In a 2006 radio interview, Micky Dolenz stated that he was the voice of Snuggle at that time.  As of late 2009, the bear was voiced by Elena M. Schloss, a New York animation and commercial voice-over actress.

Recalls 
In 2001, 150,000 Snuggle "Teeny Bean Bears" included with the sales of the product were recalled because the pom-pon of their nightcaps could detach and pose a choking hazard to babies.

In 2002, 4 million stuffed bears distributed with Snuggle fabric softener were recalled when they were determined to create a choking hazard to babies, because the eyes and nose could come off easily.

See also 
 Comfort

References

External links 
 Snuggle Product Page (U.S.)
 Snuggle Product Page (Canada)

Henkel brands
Cleaning products
Bear mascots
Fictional bears
Male characters in advertising
Mascots introduced in 1983
Products introduced in 1983
Textiles